Celebrity Big Brother 2012, also known as Celebrity Big Brother 9, was the ninth series of the British reality television series Celebrity Big Brother. It began on 5 January 2012 and ended on 27 January 2012. It was the second Celebrity series to air on Channel 5 as part of the channel's then two-year contract with the show and the ninth series of the show to air overall. The series was sponsored by Plusnet. This was the first of two series of Celebrity Big Brother to air in 2012.

The series was won by actress and television presenter Denise Welch.

Nicola McLean returned to the house for Celebrity Big Brother 19 as an All-Star, representing this series. She left the house in fifth place.

Pre-series

Adverts
Adverts for the new series began being shown from 10 December, one featuring Shaun Williamson which began airing on 12 December. An advert aired on 20 December 2011, featuring former celebrity housemates Amy Childs, Jedward and Kerry Katona and presenter Brian Dowling on Channel 5.

Sponsor
The previous sponsor, Freederm did not return to sponsor the new series. According to their Facebook fanpage, this was because, as a company, they disagreed with actor Michael Madsen's recent direct-to-DVD films and as he was to become a housemate they decided not to renew their contract with Channel 5. Therefore, this series was sponsored by Sheffield-based ISP Plusnet.

Live streaming
Due to a large outcry from fans in the 2011 series for there being no live streaming, this series introduced a new show named Big Brother: Live from the House, which was scheduled to air after every eviction for one hour on Channel 5's sister channel 5*. On Day 15, Big Brother: Live from the House won 5* its highest ever rating since its launch in 2006, with 994,000 viewers tuning in to watch the live streaming. This has called for Channel 5 to re-introduce the 24-hour live feed.

House
Channel 5 released images of the updated house two days prior to the launch on 3 January 2012. The physical layout of the house remains mostly unchanged from the previous series, however the house theme was changed to an Alpine chalet, with much wood, fur and leather furnishings. The sauna was removed and a hot tub was installed to replace it. Unlike previous versions of Celebrity Big Brother aired in the winter, the pool still remained in the garden.

The Diary Room
An image of the diary chair was released on 4 January 2012 on the official Facebook page. The chair is made from wood with leather cushioning, and contributes to theAlpine chalet theme for the house.

Housemates

Andrew Stone
Andrew Stone (born 15 December 1972) was the lead singer and songwriter for the group Starman, who is known for appearing on the Sky1 TV series Pineapple Dance Studios. He was nominated for eviction on Day 4 and was first person to be evicted on Day 7. In keeping with the "Fairy Tale" task he left via the Big Brother garden in a horse and carriage.

Denise Welch
Denise Welch (born 22 May 1958) is an English actress, dancer and television presenter, best known for her appearances on Coronation Street, Waterloo Road and Loose Women. She won the show as the contestant with the highest number of public votes. Denise has now split from her husband Tim Healy and is no longer on Loose Women.

Frankie Cocozza
Frankie Cocozza (born 17 January 1993) is a former contestant in the eighth series of The X Factor; from which he was disqualified after evidence of cocaine use surfaced. He was runner-up, coming second to celebrity Denise Welch.

Gareth Thomas
Gareth "Alfie" Thomas (born 25 July 1974), is a Welsh retired professional rugby union and rugby league player, and in December 2009, he became the first openly gay rugby player in Britain. He is the ambassador for the 2013 Rugby League World Cup. He finished the series in 3rd Place, being the third housemate eliminated in the final.

Georgia Salpa
Georgia Salpa (born 14 May 1985, Athens, Greece) is a Greek-Irish model known for appearances on Irish television in The Podge and Rodge Show, Republic of Telly, Celebrity Salon and Catwalk to Kilimanjaro. She was nominated for eviction on Day 4. She survived the vote, was not eligible to be nominated during the next round, when she was the only housemate to nominate. She was nominated on Day 11 and became the third housemate evicted on Day 14.

Karissa and Kristina Shannon
Karissa and Kristina Shannon (born 2 October 1989) are American glamour models, Playboy Playmates and twin sisters. They first appeared in the Playboy Mansion in 2008 before leaving in 2010. They finished the series in 5th Place, becoming the first housemates eliminated in the final.

Kirk Norcross
Kirk Norcross (born 21 April 1988) is a British television personality and a club promoter for Sugar Hut, a nightclub in Brentwood, Essex. He became known to the public in 2010 after appearing on The Only Way Is Essex. Norcross was nominated for eviction on Day 14 against all housemates other than Gareth, he was evicted from the house after receiving the fewest votes to save on Day 16.

Michael Madsen
Michael Madsen (born 25 September 1957) is an American actor, poet, and photographer. He has appeared in more than 150 films, most of them small independent films, though he has starred in central roles in such films as Reservoir Dogs, Free Willy, Donnie Brasco, and Kill Bill, in addition to a supporting role in Sin City. Madsen is also credited with voice work in several video games, including Grand Theft Auto III, True Crime: Streets of L.A. and DRIV3R. He was nominated for eviction on Day 11. He finished the series in 4th Place, being the second housemate eliminated in the final.

Natalie Cassidy
Natalie Cassidy (born 13 May 1983) is a British actress, most commonly known for appearing in the television soap EastEnders as Sonia Fowler. She has also appeared in the BBC Two sitcom Psychoville and was a contestant on the seventh series of Strictly Come Dancing. Natalie was evicted from the house after Kirk, in a double eviction on Day 16.

Natasha Giggs
Natasha Giggs (born 11 October 1982) is a former estate agent known for having an extramarital affair with the footballer Ryan Giggs, her brother-in-law; the affair was publicised by the media in 2011. She was nominated for eviction by Georgia on Day 7 and became the second housemate to be evicted from the house on Day 9.

Nicola McLean
Nicola McLean is an English glamour model and media personality. She finished in sixth place on the eighth series of I'm a Celebrity...Get Me Out of Here!. She was nominated for eviction by Georgia on Day 7 but survived the public vote against Natasha Giggs. McLean was a pick to win the entire series, however she began to have several meltdowns in the house. A famous line from one of her meltdowns was "Shred, Shred, Shred" when she shredded her housemates letters from home. In the final week Nicola polled the fewest votes of the remaining housemates and was consequently evicted on Day 21, two days before the final. She later returned to compete in Celebrity Big Brother 19 as an "All star" housemate.

Romeo
MC Romeo (born 23 October 1980; real name Marvin Dawkins) is an English rapper/MC, who found fame in the UK garage group So Solid Crew. Romeo previously appeared on reality TV in The Games (Channel 4) and Don't Tell the Bride (BBC Three). Romeo made it to the final week, but polled the fewest votes in the six-way vote after Nicola was evicted, and was evicted on Day 21, two days before the final.

Weekly summary

Nominations table

Notes

Ratings
Official ratings are taken from BARB. +1 ratings are also taken from the Broadcast Audience Research Board.

References

External links
 Official website
 Official Celebrity Big Brother Page Archived
 

2012 in British television
2012 British television seasons
09
Channel 5 (British TV channel) reality television shows